The 2023 season is Blaublitz Akita' s third season in the J2 League, and the tenth as a J.League member. The annual club slogan is "Shin and Akita together" (シン・秋田一体).

Squad
As of 2023 season.

Out on loan

Transfers

J2 League
In the 2023 season of the J2, Blaublitz will play 42 home-and-away matches.

Emperor's Cup

As a J2 League member, the club earns a direct entry to the second round of the competition, not needing to participate in the prefectural qualifications for the competition.

Other games

Gallery

References

External links
 J.League official site

Blaublitz Akita
Blaublitz Akita seasons